General Alkiviadis Stefanis, is a Greek army officer who in 2017–2019 served as Chief of the Hellenic Army General Staff. Since 9 July 2019, he is the Deputy Minister for National Defence in the Cabinet of Kyriakos Mitsotakis.

Military career
Alkiviadis Stefanis was born on October 7, 1959 in Athens. He attended the Hellenic Army Academy, from which he graduated in 1982 as a Cavalry–Armour Second Lieutenant. As a junior armour officer, he served in various tank units as squad and company commander, completed the US Army's Armored Advanced Course at Fort Knox in 1994, and then served for two years in the Hellenic Army's Armour School at Avlonas. In 1997, he attended the Superior War School, going on to command the 98th National Guard Armour Battalion at Lesbos from 1998 to 2000.

In 2000–2002 he served as army adjutant for the President of the Hellenic Republic, Konstantinos Stephanopoulos. During that period he completed an MBA in Crisis Response Operations. From 2002–2005, he served as operations staff officer in the Greek military delegation to NATO headquarters. In 2005–2007 he served as Director of the Armed Forces Transformation Bureau at the Hellenic National Defence General Staff. During this period he completed correspondence courses at the National Defence Academy.

Following promotion to colonel in 2007, he served as chief of staff to the 23rd Armoured Brigade, and in 2008 completed an MBA on Security Strategies at the US National Defense University with distinction. On his return to Greece he was appointed deputy commander of the 50th Infantry Brigade in 2009. Promoted to brigade general in 2010, he served as head of the Defence Planning Directorate of the Hellenic Army General Staff (HAGS), and commander of the 23rd armoured Brigade in 2011–2013.

In 2013 he was promoted to major general and director of the HAGS 4th Branch (Organization, Planning and Training). In July of the same year he served as operational commander of the EU international exercise MILEX 13. In 2014 he was appointed commander of the 95th National Guard Higher Command, before returning to command 4th Branch/HAGS.  In March 2016 he was promoted to lieutenant general and commander of the III Corps/NRDC-GR, until he was chosen as Chief of the HAGS on 16 January 2017. 

On 25 January 2019, the Government Council for Foreign Affairs and Defence, as part of a major reshuffle of the military leadership, announced his replacement by Lt. General Georgios Kambas. According to Greek press reports, Stefanis had been a leading contender for the vacant position of Chief of the Hellenic National Defence General Staff, but lost out to the air force chief, Christos Christodoulou, who enjoyed a closer working relationship with the previous Chief of the HNDGS, and now Minister for National Defence, Admiral Evangelos Apostolakis. Stefanis was promoted to the rank of full general and retired from service on 1 February 2019, handing over his office to Lt. General Kambas.

Political career
From 9 July 2019 he is serving as Deputy Minister of National Defence as a non-political member in the Cabinet of Kyriakos Mitsotakis, under Minister Nikos Panagiotopoulos. 

On 23 October 2019, he was given the role of special coordinator for all government agencies in the context of the European migrant crisis, and the refugees located in the eastern Aegean islands.

Decorations
 Grand Commander of the Order of Honour
 Grand Commander of the Order of the Phoenix
 Cross of Honour and Military Merit of Luxembourg
 Various meritorious service and command commemorations of the Hellenic Armed Forces

References 

1959 births
Hellenic Army generals
Chiefs of the Hellenic Army General Staff
Living people
Military personnel from Athens
National Defense University alumni
Government ministers of Greece